Marie-Marguerite Dufay, best known as Marie-Guite Dufay (born 21 May 1949), is a French politician of the Socialist Party (PS) who serves as president of the regional council of Bourgogne-Franche-Comté.

Political career
Dufay was first elected to the Besançon city council in 1989. Six years later, she was appointed as deputy mayor of Besançon (1995 to 2008). In the 2004 Franche-Comté regional election, she was second in the Socialist List just after Raymond Forni. After the death of President Raymond Forni, she was elected by the assembly as President of the Region. She won the nomination to be the next socialist candidate for President of Franche-Comté in 2010.

Ahead of the 2017 presidential election, Dufay endorsed Emmanuel Macron.

References

External links
 Biography of Marie-Marguerite Dufay

|-

|-

|-

 

|-

 

1949 births
Franche-Comté Regional Councillors
Living people
President of Franche-Comté
Socialist Party (France) politicians
Women in Franche-Comté politics